The 2019 Men's Junior Pan-American Volleyball Cup was the fourth edition of the bi-annual men's volleyball tournament. Eight teams participated in this edition held in Tarapoto, Peru. Cuba defeated Canada in the final match to win the tournament. As Cuba had already qualified for the 2019 Men's U21 World Championship through the NORCECA championship and Canada qualified through world ranking, Puerto Rico as the Bronze medalist qualified for the World Championship. José Romero won the MVP award.

Competing nations

Competition format

 Eight teams will be divided into two pools. In the group stage each pool will play round robin.
 The first rank teams of each pool after group stage will receive byes into the semifinals.
 The second and third rank teams in each pool will play in the quarterfinals.

Preliminary round
All times are in Peru Standard Time (UTC−05:00)

Group A

Group B

Final round

Championship bracket

Quarterfinals

Classification 5/8

Semifinals

Classification 7/8

Classification 5/6

3rd place match

Final

Final standing

Jose Gutierrez,
Julio Cardenas,
Carlos Charles,
Adrian Chirino,
Julio Gomez,
Henry Pelayo,
Gustavo Bolaños,
Jose Romero,
Luis Alfen,
Víctor Andreu,
Raico Altunaga

Individual awards

Most Valuable Player
 
Best Scorer
 
Best Setter
 
Best Opposite
 
Best Outside Hitters
 
 
Best Middle Blockers
 
 
Best Libero
 
Best Server
 
Best Receiver
 
Best Digger

References

External links

Men's Pan-American Volleyball Cup
Pan-American
International volleyball competitions hosted by Peru
2019 in Peruvian sport
May 2019 sports events in South America